"Miracle on 34th Street" is the Christmas episode, broadcast November 27, 1959, of the American color anthology television series NBC Friday Night Special Presentation which showcased drama, comedy and musical entertainment (produced by TV veteran David Susskind) and occasional news special reports, while alternating once per month with The Bell Telephone Hour musical series, also in color, in the 8:30–9:30 pm time slot from September 11, 1959 until June 17, 1960.

Plot
The story takes place between Thanksgiving Day and Christmas Day in New York City, and focuses on the impact of a department store Santa Claus who claims to be the real Santa.

Cast
Ed Wynn as Kris Kringle
Peter Lind Hayes as Fred Gaily
Mary Healy as Doris Walker
Orson Bean as Dr. William Sawyer
Loring Smith as Mr. Shellhammer
Hiram Sherman as R. H. Macy
Susan Gordon as Susan Walker
Lawrence Weber as Mr. Mara
John Gibson as Judge Harper
Joey Walsh as Al, post office employee
Arnie Freeman as Lou, post office employee
William Post, Jr. as Mr. Gimbel
Shirley Eggleston as Peter's mother
Frank Daly as the bailiff
William Griffis as first Santa Claus

Production

Casting
The movie stars Ed Wynn, a recent Golden Globe Award for Best Supporting Actor – Motion Picture nominee for 1956's The Great Man and soon-to-be Academy Award for Best Supporting Actor nominee for that year's production of The Diary of Anne Frank. Co-starring with Wynn were married actors and musical entertainers Peter Lind Hayes and Mary Healy who frequently performed together. Between 1949 and 1951 they were regulars on four TV shows and, during their prime decade, the 1950s, were seen almost continuously. Ten months after this broadcast, a sitcom built around their personal life, Peter Loves Mary, was on NBC's schedule for the 1960–61 season. Their marriage lasted 58 years, from 1940 until Hayes' death in 1998.

Also in the cast, playing the befuddled psychiatrist, was equally frequent TV performer Orson Bean, a regular, at the time, on the quiz show Keep Talking, and child actress Susan Gordon who, earlier that year, had worked on episodes of two other live TV series, Playhouse 90 and Goodyear Theatre as well as in two theatrical films, The Man in the Net and The Five Pennies.

Broadcast
Presented the Friday after Thankgiving, the live broadcast of Miracle on 34th Street was directed by William Corrigan.

Recording
The broadcast was long believed to have no surviving copies, but a kinescope was discovered at the Library of Congress where it was shown in December 2005. Susan Gordon who played Mary Healy's daughter and was ten at the time of the broadcast, attended the screening. She was 56 and died six years later at the age of 62. Mary Healy lived to be 96 and died in 2015.

References

External links
 

1959 films
1959 American television episodes
1959 drama films
1950s fantasy films
American children's fantasy films
American children's films
American Christmas films
American drama films
Remakes of American films
Films set in department stores
Films set in New York City
Miracle on 34th Street
Santa Claus in film
Santa Claus in television
1950s English-language films
1950s American films